An internal control region is a sequence of DNA located with the coding region of eukaryotic genes that binds regulatory elements such as activators or repressors. This region can recruit RNA Polymerase or contribute to splicing.

See also
 DNA
 Gene expression
 Gene family

References

 Google Book Search; first published 1976.

External links
 DNA From The Beginning - a primer on genes and DNA
 Genes And DNA - Introduction to genes and DNA aimed at non-biologist
 ENCODE threads Explorer Characterization of intergenic regions and gene definition. Nature (journal)

Molecular biology